Sir Allan MacNab Secondary School is located at 145 Magnolia Drive in Hamilton, Ontario, Canada, and is a member of the Hamilton-Wentworth District School Board. Sir Allan MacNab Secondary School opened in 1969 and  has 873 students. The school was founded in 1969 and is named for Sir Allan MacNab, the last Premier of Upper Canada before Confederation and a resident, lawyer and politician in Hamilton from 1826 until his death in 1826 at his home, Dundurn Castle. Located on the west mountain of Hamilton, the school catchment area extends into Glanbrook and Ancaster.

Notable alumni 
 Shai Gilgeous-Alexander NBA Basketball Player
 Ashley Leggat Canadian Actress
 Mark Anthony Graham Canadian Olympic Track and Field Athlete
Kurtis Conner Internet Personality

See also
Allan MacNab
List of high schools in Ontario

References

External links

High schools in Hamilton, Ontario
Educational institutions established in 1969
1969 establishments in Ontario